Ignacio Posada (3 March 1935 – 15 January 2015) was a Colombian fencer. He competed in the individual and team foil and individual sabre events at the 1964 Summer Olympics.

References

1935 births
2015 deaths
Colombian male foil fencers
Olympic fencers of Colombia
Fencers at the 1964 Summer Olympics
Colombian male sabre fencers
20th-century Colombian people